Here are several lists of National Hockey League players' salaries since the 1989–90 NHL season. This list does not include income from corporate endorsements or salaries before .

Top 20 salaries in the NHL since 1989
This is a list of the twenty NHL players who have earned the most in salaries between the 1989–90 season and the 2020–21 season.

These figures have been gleaned from certain financial sites dedicated to professional sports, and so may not be perfectly accurate. This is merely an estimation that, for the most part, does not take into account bonuses and sponsor contracts.

These totals also do not take into account partial seasons played—for which a player would only receive a partial salary—except for the shortened 2004–05 season, which affected every player. Thus, the listed totals are a sum of the amounts each player was contracted to receive for a full season.

† "Years active" excludes the 2004–05 NHL season, as the league was not operating that year. It also includes seasons prior to the 1989–90 NHL season, although the salaries paid during this time may not be included in the total due to scarcity of information.
a Jonathan Toews missed the entire 2020–21 NHL season due to illness.
b Henrik Lundqvist missed the entire 2020–21 NHL season due to illness.

Top five contracts by season

1989–90 season

 Mario Lemieux (Pittsburgh Penguins) $2 million
 Wayne Gretzky (Los Angeles Kings) $1.72 million
 Mark Messier (Edmonton Oilers) $0.86 million
 Steve Yzerman (Detroit Red Wings) $0.7 million
 Bryan Trottier (New York Islanders) $0.575 million

1990–91 season
 Wayne Gretzky (Los Angeles Kings) $3 million
 Mario Lemieux (Pittsburgh Penguins) $2.18 million
 Steve Yzerman (Detroit Red Wings) $1.3 million
 Ray Bourque (Boston Bruins) $1.194 million
 Brett Hull (St. Louis Blues) $1.116 million

1991–92 season
 Wayne Gretzky (Los Angeles Kings) $3 million
 Mario Lemieux (Pittsburgh Penguins) $2.34 million
 Brett Hull (St. Louis Blues) $1.5 million
 Pat LaFontaine (Buffalo Sabres) $1.4 million
 Steve Yzerman (Detroit Red Wings) $1.4 million

1992–93 season
 Eric Lindros (Philadelphia Flyers) $3.5 million
 Wayne Gretzky (Los Angeles Kings) $3 million
 Mario Lemieux (Pittsburgh Penguins) $2.408 million
 Mark Messier (New York Rangers) $2.385 million
 Pat LaFontaine (Buffalo Sabres) $1.775 million

1993–94 season

 Eric Lindros (Philadelphia Flyers) $3.35 million
 Steve Yzerman (Detroit Red Wings) $3.2 million
 Mario Lemieux (Pittsburgh Penguins) $3 million
 Wayne Gretzky (Los Angeles Kings) $3 million
 Patrick Roy (Montreal Canadiens) $2.6593 million

1994–95 season
After the 1994–95 NHL season was shortened to 48 games due to a lockout, players earned only about 56% of their predicted salary.
 Wayne Gretzky (Los Angeles Kings) $3.66 million (Predicted salary of $6.54 million)
 Mark Messier (New York Rangers) $3.45 million (Predicted salary of $6.29 million)
 Scott Stevens (New Jersey Devils) $3.24 million (Predicted salary of $5.8 million)
 Pavel Bure (Vancouver Canucks) $2.61 million (Predicted salary of $4.5 million)
 Mario Lemieux (Pittsburgh Penguins) $2.361,429 million (Predicted salary of $4.071429 million)

1995–96 season
 Wayne Gretzky (Los Angeles Kings/St. Louis Blues) $6.54 million
 Mark Messier (New York Rangers) $6.29 million
 Keith Tkachuk (Winnipeg Jets) $6 million
 Mario Lemieux (Pittsburgh Penguins) $4.5714 million
 Pavel Bure (Vancouver Canucks) $4.5 million

1996–97 season
 Mario Lemieux (Pittsburgh Penguins) $11.35 million
 Mark Messier (New York Rangers) $6 million
 Pavel Bure (Vancouver Canucks) $5 million
 Pat LaFontaine (Buffalo Sabres) $4.6 million
 Patrick Roy (Colorado Avalanche) $4.567 million

1997–98 season
 Joe Sakic (Colorado Avalanche) $16.45 million 
 Chris Gratton (Philadelphia Flyers) $10.15 million
 Wayne Gretzky (New York Rangers) $6.25 million
 Mark Messier (New York Rangers) $6 million
 Pavel Bure (Vancouver Canucks) $5.5 million

1998–99 season
 Sergei Fedorov (Detroit Red Wings) $14.5 million 
 Paul Kariya (Anaheim Ducks) $8.25 million
 Eric Lindros (Philadelphia Flyers) $8 million
 Dominik Hasek (Buffalo Sabres) $8 million
 Mats Sundin (Toronto Maple Leafs) $6.347 million

1999–00 season

 Jaromir Jagr (Pittsburgh Penguins) $11.7 million
 Paul Kariya (Anaheim Ducks) $11 million
 Peter Forsberg (Colorado Avalanche) $9 million
 Theoren Fleury (New York Rangers) $8.5 million
 Eric Lindros (Philadelphia Flyers) $8.5 million

2000–01 season
 Peter Forsberg (Colorado Avalanche) $10 million
 Paul Kariya (Anaheim Ducks) $10 million
 Jaromir Jagr (Pittsburgh Penguins) $9.842708 million
 Pavel Bure (Florida Panthers) $9 million
 Keith Tkachuk (St. Louis Blues) $7.3 million

2001–02 season
 Jaromir Jagr (Washington Capitals) $11 million
 Pavel Bure (Florida Panthers/New York Rangers) $10 million
 Paul Kariya (Anaheim Ducks) $10 million
 Joe Sakic (Colorado Avalanche) $9.832727 million
 Chris Pronger (St. Louis Blues) $9.5 million
 Teemu Selanne (San Jose Sharks) $9.5 million

2002–03 season
 Jaromir Jagr (Washington Capitals) $11.483333 million
 Keith Tkachuk (St. Louis Blues) $11 million
 Nicklas Lidstrom (Detroit Red Wings) $10.5 million
 Pavel Bure (New York Rangers) $10 million
 Paul Kariya (Mighty Ducks of Anaheim) $10 million

2003–04 season

 Peter Forsberg (Colorado Avalanche) $11 million
 Jaromir Jagr (Washington Capitals) $11 million
 Sergei Fedorov (Mighty Ducks of Anaheim) $10 million
 Nicklas Lidstrom (Detroit Red Wings) $10 million
 Keith Tkachuk (St. Louis Blues) $10 million

2004–05 season
Season cancelled (see 2004–05 NHL lockout).

2005–06 season
The team salary cap was $39 million. Under the latest NHL Collective Bargaining Agreement, no player could earn more than 20 percent of the team salary cap ($7.8 million).
 Jaromir Jagr (New York Rangers) $8.36 million
 Nicklas Lidstrom (Detroit Red Wings) $7.6 million
 Keith Tkachuk (St. Louis Blues) $7.6 million
 Alexei Yashin (New York Islanders) $7.6 million
 Jarome Iginla (Calgary Flames) $7 million

2006–07 season
The team salary cap was $44 million. No player could earn more than $8.8 million.
 Jaromir Jagr (New York Rangers) $8.36 million
 Brad Richards (Tampa Bay Lightning) $7.8 million
 Nicklas Lidstrom (Detroit Red Wings) $7.6 million
 Mats Sundin (Toronto Maple Leafs) $7.6 million
 Alexei Yashin (New York Islanders) $7.6 million

2007–08 season
The team salary cap was $50.3 million. No player could earn more than $10.06 million.
 Daniel Briere (Philadelphia Flyers) $10 million
 Scott Gomez (New York Rangers) $10 million
 Thomas Vanek (Buffalo Sabres) $10 million
 Jaromir Jagr (New York Rangers) $8.36 million
 Kimmo Timonen (Philadelphia Flyers) $8 million

2008–09 season
The team salary cap was $56.7 million. No player could earn more than $11.34 million.
 Dany Heatley (Ottawa Senators) $10 million
 Sidney Crosby (Pittsburgh Penguins) $9 million
 Alexander Ovechkin (Washington Capitals) $9 million
 Mats Sundin (Vancouver Canucks) $8.6 million
 Miikka Kiprusoff (Calgary Flames) $8.5 million

2009–10 season
The team salary cap was $56.8 million. No player could earn more than $11.36 million.
 Vincent Lecavalier (Tampa Bay Lightning) $10 million
 Sidney Crosby (Pittsburgh Penguins) $9 million
 Evgeni Malkin (Pittsburgh Penguins) $9 million
 Alexander Ovechkin (Washington Capitals) $9 million
 Chris Drury (New York Rangers) $8.05 million

2010–11 season
The team salary cap was $59.4 million. No player could earn more than $11.88 million.
 Vincent Lecavalier (Tampa Bay Lightning) $10 million
 Roberto Luongo (Vancouver Canucks) $10 million
 Sidney Crosby (Pittsburgh Penguins) $9 million
 Evgeni Malkin (Pittsburgh Penguins) $9 million
 Alexander Ovechkin (Washington Capitals) $9 million

2011–12 season
The team salary cap was $64.3 million. No player could earn more than $12.86 million.
 Brad Richards (New York Rangers) $12 million
 Ilya Bryzgalov (Philadelphia Flyers) $10 million
 Christian Ehrhoff (Buffalo Sabres) $10 million
 Vincent Lecavalier (Tampa Bay Lightning) $10 million
 Sidney Crosby (Pittsburgh Penguins) $9 million

2012–13 season
The team salary cap was $70.2 million. No player could earn more than $14.04 million.
 Shea Weber (Nashville Predators) $14 million
 Tyler Myers (Buffalo Sabres) $12 million
 Zach Parise (Minnesota Wild) $12 million
 Brad Richards (New York Rangers) $12 million
 Ryan Suter (Minnesota Wild) $12 million

2013–14 season
The team salary cap was $64.3 million. No player could earn more than $12.86 million.
 Shea Weber (Nashville Predators) $14 million
 Sidney Crosby (Pittsburgh Penguins) $12 million
 Zach Parise (Minnesota Wild) $12 million
 Ryan Suter (Minnesota Wild) $12 million
 Eric Staal (Carolina Hurricanes) $9.25 million

2014–15 season
The team salary cap was $69 million. No player could earn more than $13.8 million.
 Shea Weber (Nashville Predators) $14 million
 Sidney Crosby (Pittsburgh Penguins) $12 million
 Henrik Lundqvist (New York Rangers) $11 million
 Zach Parise (Minnesota Wild) $11 million
 Ryan Suter (Minnesota Wild) $11 million

2015–16 season
The team salary cap was $71.4 million. No player could earn more than $14.28 million.
 Shea Weber (Nashville Predators) $14 million
 Patrick Kane (Chicago Blackhawks) $13.8 million
 Jonathan Toews (Chicago Blackhawks) $13.8 million
 Sidney Crosby (Pittsburgh Penguins) $12 million
 Phil Kessel (Pittsburgh Penguins) $10 million

2016–17 season
The team salary cap was $73 million. No player could earn more than $14.6 million.
 Anze Kopitar (Los Angeles Kings) $14 million
 Patrick Kane (Chicago Blackhawks) $13.8 million
 Jonathan Toews (Chicago Blackhawks) $13.8 million
 Shea Weber (Montreal Canadiens) $12 million
 Ryan O'Reilly (Buffalo Sabres) $11 million

2017–18 season
The team salary cap was $75 million. No player could earn more than $15 million.
 Patrick Kane (Chicago Blackhawks) $13.8 million
 Jonathan Toews (Chicago Blackhawks) $13.8 million
 Jamie Benn (Dallas Stars) $13 million
 Anze Kopitar (Los Angeles Kings) $13 million
 Shea Weber (Montreal Canadiens) $12 million

2018–19 season
The team salary cap was $79.5 million. No player could earn more than $15.9 million.
 John Tavares (Toronto Maple Leafs) $15.9 million
 Connor McDavid (Edmonton Oilers) $15 million
 Carey Price (Montreal Canadiens) $15 million
 Jamie Benn (Dallas Stars) $13 million
 John Carlson (Washington Capitals) $12 million

2019–20 season
The team salary cap was $81.5 million. No player could earn more than $16.3 million.
 Mitch Marner (Toronto Maple Leafs) $16 million
 Auston Matthews (Toronto Maple Leafs) $15.9 million
 John Tavares (Toronto Maple Leafs) $15.9 million
 Connor McDavid (Edmonton Oilers) $15 million
 Carey Price (Montreal Canadiens) $15 million

2020–21 season
The team salary cap was $81.5 million. No player could earn more than $16.3 million.
 Auston Matthews (Toronto Maple Leafs $15.9 million
 Mitch Marner (Toronto Maple Leafs) $15 million
 Connor McDavid (Edmonton Oilers) $14 million
 Artemi Panarin (New York Rangers) $13 million
 Sergei Bobrovsky (Florida Panthers) $12 million

2021–22 season
The team salary cap is $81.5 million. No player can earn more than $16.3 million.
 Erik Karlsson (San Jose Sharks) $14.5 million
 Connor McDavid (Edmonton Oilers) $13 million
 Artemi Panarin (New York Rangers) $13 million
 Carey Price (Montreal Canadiens) $13 million
 Tyler Seguin (Dallas Stars) $13 million

2022–23 season
The team salary cap will be $82.5 million. No player can earn more than $16.5 million.
 Tyler Seguin (Dallas Stars) $13 million
 Artemi Panarin (New York Rangers) $12.5 million
 Aleksander Barkov (Florida Panthers) $12 million
 Sergei Bobrovsky (Florida Panthers) $12 million
 Connor McDavid (Edmonton Oilers) $12 million

Sample salaries from earlier seasons

Salary figures prior to the 1989–90 season are not readily available. The following table presents a sample of salaries from various seasons; the players listed were not necessarily the highest paid that year.

† Ronnie Rowe was offered a rookie contract of $2,900 plus $100 as a signing bonus. The contract was declined, and Rowe stayed in juniors to play with the OHA's Toronto Marlboros 
†† Bobby Hull was playing the World Hockey Association at this time, a short-lived rival to the NHL.

See also

 List of team payrolls in the NHL, for yearly team payrolls
 Salary cap
 NHL Players Association
 Highest-paid NBA players by season
 List of highest paid Major League Baseball players

Notes

External links
USA Today Salaries Database NHL salaries from 2000–2007
NHLSCAP - Up to date NHL Salary cap information
CapGeek.com
http://www.hockeybuzz.com/cap-central/index.php
http://www.nhlnumbers.com/
NHL players' salary history

National Hockey League lists
National Hockey League labor relations
NHL players
National Hockey League